This page gathers the results of elections in Piedmont.

Regional elections

Latest regional election

The latest regional election took place on 26 May 2019. Alberto Cirio of Forza Italia, who was supported also by Lega Nord Piemont (LNP) and other parties, defeated incumbent President Sergio Chiamparino of the Democratic Party. The LNP was by far the largest party.

List of previous regional elections
1970 Piedmontese regional election
1975 Piedmontese regional election
1980 Piedmontese regional election
1985 Piedmontese regional election
1990 Piedmontese regional election
1995 Piedmontese regional election
2000 Piedmontese regional election
2005 Piedmontese regional election
2010 Piedmontese regional election
2014 Piedmontese regional election

Italian general elections in Piedmont

Latest general election

List of previous general elections
1946 Italian general election in Piedmont
1948 Italian general election in Piedmont
1953 Italian general election in Piedmont
1958 Italian general election in Piedmont
1963 Italian general election in Piedmont
1968 Italian general election in Piedmont
1972 Italian general election in Piedmont
1976 Italian general election in Piedmont
1979 Italian general election in Piedmont
1983 Italian general election in Piedmont
1987 Italian general election in Piedmont
1992 Italian general election in Piedmont
1994 Italian general election in Piedmont
1996 Italian general election in Piedmont
2001 Italian general election in Piedmont
2006 Italian general election in Piedmont
2008 Italian general election in Piedmont
2013 Italian general election in Piedmont

European Parliament elections in Piedmont

Latest European Parliament election

List of previous European Parliament elections
1979 European Parliament election in Piedmont
1984 European Parliament election in Piedmont
1989 European Parliament election in Piedmont
1994 European Parliament election in Piedmont
1989 European Parliament election in Piedmont
2004 European Parliament election in Piedmont
2009 European Parliament election in Piedmont
2014 European Parliament election in Piedmont

References

 
Politics of Piedmont